Deirdre Kinahan is an Irish playwright and theatre producer.

Life
Deirdre Kinahan was born in Dublin in 1968.
She lives in County Meath with her husband and two daughters since 1998.

She founded and ran Tall Tales Theatre Company for fifteen years writing and producing many award-winning theatre productions.
She has served as a board member of Theatre Forum Ireland and The Abbey Theatre.
She is a member of Aosdána, a body of elected Irish artists considered to have made an outstanding contribution to cultural life.  Deirdre has collaborated with many major theatres in Ireland and on the International circuit including The Old Vic, Royal Court, Bush Theatre London, MTC, Irish Arts Centre and Studio Theatre US.   She writes for the Abbey Theatre, Landmark Productions and Fishamble Theatre Company regularly in Ireland.

Works

Plays
Include
 Bé Carna. Women of the Flesh (1999) — Tall Tales Theatre co.
.Passage (2001) — Civic Theatre, Tall Tales Theatre co.
 Attaboy, Mr. Synge! (2002) — Civic Theatre, Tall Tales Theatre co.
 Knocknashee (2002) — Civic theatre, Tall Tales Theatre co.
 Melody (2005) — Tall Tales Theatre co.
 Hue and Cry (2007) — Tall Tales Theatre co and Bewleys Cafe Theatre
 Bogboy (2010) — Tall Tales Theatre co
 Moment (2011) — Tall Tales Theatre co and Bush Theatre
 These Halcyon Days (2013) — Tall Tales Theatre co and Landmark Productions
 Spinning (2014) — Fishamble Theatre co
 Rise (2016) — Old Vic
 Rathmines Road (2018) — Fishamble Theatre co and Abbey Theatre
 The Unmanageable Sisters (2018) — Abbey Theatre
 Crossings (2018) — Pentabus Theatre co
 Embargo (2020) — Fishamble Theatre co
An Old Song, Half Forgotten (2023) — Abbey Theatre
 The Saviour Landmark Productions
 OUTRAGE Fishamble Theatre Co
 The Visit Draiocht

Producer
 Passage (Tall Tales Theatre Company, 2001)
 Melody (Tall Tales Theatre Company, 2005)

Awards
 Member, Aosdána
 Edinburgh Fringe First, Halcyon Days
 Helen Hayes DC, MOMENT.
 Dora Awards Canada, MOMENT.
 Jeff Chicago, Spinning.
 Helen Hayes DC, Wild Notes.
 First Irish NYC, BOGBOY.

See also
 List of Irish writers

References

Aosdána members
20th-century Irish women writers
21st-century Irish women writers
Writers from Dublin (city)
Year of birth missing (living people)
Living people